The GEMS American Academy is a for-profit  private school in  Khalifa City, Abu Dhabi, United Arab Emirates. It offers an American curriculum as well as the International Baccalaureate (IB) curriculum. The school is a member of the GEMS Education network of schools.

GAA History
GEMS American Academy (GAA) was founded in 2011 in central Abu Dhabi.  On December 13, 2011, President Bill Clinton, the 42nd President of the United States, opened GAA in a new facility in Khalifa City in the presence of His Highness Sheikh Nahyan bin Mubarak Al Nahyan, UAE Minister of Higher Education and Scientific Research and His Excellency Humaid Mohammed Al Khathami, UAE Minister of Education.

See also

 Americans in the United Arab Emirates

References

External links
 GEMS American Academy - Abu Dhabi

Private schools in the United Arab Emirates
Schools in the Emirate of Abu Dhabi
Schools in Abu Dhabi
GEMS schools
American international schools in the United Arab Emirates
2011 establishments in the United Arab Emirates
Educational institutions established in 2011